A quark is an elementary particle.

Quark may also refer to:

 "Quark", a nonce word in James Joyce's Finnegans Wake, and the origin of the particle name

Computing
 Quark (company), a software manufacturer
 Quark (kernel), a microkernel used in the MorphOS operating system
 QuArK or Quake Army Knife, a game editor
 Quark (hash function), a cryptographic hash function
 Intel Quark, a line of CPUs designed for small size and low power consumption
 Quarks, X resources representing strings using integers

Entertainment

Music
 Quark Records, a former name of Emanem Records
 "Quark" (song), a 1994 song by Die Ärzte
 "Quark", a 1995 song by BT from Ima

Fictional characters
 Quark (Star Trek), in the television series Star Trek: Deep Space Nine
 Captain Qwark, a character in Ratchet & Clank video games
 Quark, in Valhalla
 Quark, a Marvel Comics character often associated with Longshot
 Quark, a type of robot from Doctor Who
 Quark, a white dragon from Lunar: The Silver Star and its remakes
 Quark, the family dog in Honey, I Shrunk the Kids
 Quark, in Zero Escape: Virtue's Last Reward

Other uses
 Quark (anthology series), four books of original short stories and poetry published in 1970 and 1971
 Quark (magazine), a 1970s popular science and puzzle magazine
 Quark (TV series), a short-lived 1977/1978 science fiction sitcom

Other uses
Quark (technical festival), an annual technical festival
 Quark (dairy product), a type of fresh dairy product similar to cottage cheese
 Peugeot Quark, a concept car

See also
 Quark, Strangeness and Charm, an album by Hawkwind
 "Quark, Strangeness and Charm" (song), the title track of this album
 Quirks & Quarks, a Canadian weekly science news program
 Quirk (disambiguation)
 Cark, a village in Cumbria, England